Charles Brandon, 3rd Duke of Suffolk (12 October 1537 – 14 July 1551), known as Lord Charles Brandon until shortly before his death, was the son of the 1st Duke of Suffolk and the suo jure 12th Baroness Willoughby de Eresby.

His father had previously been married to Mary Tudor, sister of King Henry VIII. Following Mary's death, he had married Lady Willoughby de Eresby, who had been originally intended as the bride of his son Henry.

In 1541, Lord Charles Brandon and his older brother Lord Henry Brandon had their miniatures painted by Hans Holbein the Younger.

He died of the sweating sickness one hour after the same disease claimed his elder brother Henry (who had succeeded their father as 2nd Duke of Suffolk in 1545), and because of this holds the record for the shortest tenure of a British peerage. (The 2nd Baron Stamp may claim a shorter tenure, but merely through a legal fiction.) Suffolk died without issue and his title became extinct. They died at the Bishop of Lincoln's Palace, Buckden, in the village of Buckden near Huntingdon, Huntingdonshire, where they had fled in an attempt to escape the epidemic.

A solemn celebration of the funerals of the two Dukes, called a 'Month's Mind', was held on 22 September 1551 with all the funeral equipment in duplicate. The humanist intellectuals Thomas Wilson and Walter Haddon wrote a life of Suffolk and his older brother shortly after their death.

References

Further reading
The Life and Career of Charles Brandon, Duke of Suffolk, c. 1484–1545, by S. J. Gunn (on his father)
Catherine Willoughby, by Evelyn Read (on his mother)

|-

203
1530s births
1551 deaths
Deaths from sweating sickness
16th-century English nobility
Willoughby family
Charles
Alumni of St John's College, Cambridge
Royalty and nobility who died as children